Mario Bazán (born 1 September 1987 in Lima) is a Peruvian runner specializing in the 3000 metres steeplechase.

Career
He competed at the 2012 Summer Olympics without reaching the final.

Competition record

1 Out of competition performance

Personal bests
1000 metres – 2:25.32 (Belém 2006)
1500 metres – 3:43.68 (Lima 2009)
3000 metres – 7:57.95 (Iquique 2008)
5000 metres – 14:03.20 (Rio de Janeiro 2010)
3000 metres steeplechase – 8:28.67 (Berlin 2009)

References

External links
 
 Sports reference biography

Sportspeople from Lima
Peruvian male middle-distance runners
Peruvian male long-distance runners
1986 births
Living people
Olympic athletes of Peru
Athletes (track and field) at the 2012 Summer Olympics
Athletes (track and field) at the 2007 Pan American Games
Athletes (track and field) at the 2011 Pan American Games
Athletes (track and field) at the 2019 Pan American Games
Peruvian male steeplechase runners
Athletes (track and field) at the 2018 South American Games
South American Games gold medalists for Peru
South American Games medalists in athletics
Pan American Games bronze medalists for Peru
Pan American Games medalists in athletics (track and field)
Medalists at the 2019 Pan American Games
21st-century Peruvian people